Mykael Wright is an American football cornerback for the Seattle Sea Dragons of the XFL. He played college football at Oregon.

High school career
Wright attended Valencia High School in Valencia, Santa Clarita, California before transferring to Antelope Valley High School in Lancaster, California for his senior year. He played in the 2019 Under Armour All-American Game and the Polynesian Bowl. Wright committed to the University of Oregon to play college football.

College career
As a true freshman at Oregon in 2019, Wright played in all 14 games, recording 21 tackles, one interception and two kick return for touchdowns. Wright started all seven games in 2020, recording 27 tackles. He returned as a starter in 2021.

Professional career
Wright was not selected during the 2022 NFL Draft.

Arizona Cardinals
Wright went to Arizona Cardinals rookie mini-camp as an undrafted free agent.

Seattle Sea Dragons
On November 17, 2022, Wright was drafted by the Seattle Sea Dragons of the XFL.

References

External links
Oregon Ducks bio

Living people
Players of American football from California
American football cornerbacks
Oregon Ducks football players
Arizona Cardinals players
Seattle Sea Dragons players
People from Lancaster, California
Antelope Valley High School alumni
People from Los Angeles County, California
2000 births